The epipterygoid is a paired cranial bone present in many tetrapods. It acts as a vertical strut connecting the pterygoid bone of the palate to the outer surface of the braincase or the underside of the skull roof. The epipterygoid is an endochondral bone (derived from cartilage), similar to the braincase but unlike most other bones in the skull. In squamates, the epipterygoid generally has a slender rod-like shape, and is also known as the columella cranii. The epipterygoid is considered to be homologous to the alisphenoid bone of mammals. Though present in many extinct archosaurs, it has been independently lost in modern crocodilians and birds.

References 

Vertebrate anatomy
Bones of the head and neck